Zoya Hussain is an Indian actress, writer and director who predominantly appears in Hindi films. She got recognition for her role in Mukkabaaz, directed by Anurag Kashyap.

Career
Zoya Hussain was born and brought up in Delhi. She started her career as an actress with the film Mukkabaaz. She first met Anurag Kashyap for the script she had written and wanted Anurag to give his feedback on the same. But Anurag didn't find the script and approached Zoya for playing a role in his next Mukkabaaz. Regarding her role in the film, Raja Sen of NDTV stated that "Zoya Hussain is great in an excessively demanding part, mute but loud as can be, the feistiest heroine we've had in a while".

Filmography

Web series

Music videos

References

External links 

Indian film actresses
Indian female models
Living people
1990 births